Olfa Kanoun is professor for measurement and sensor technology at the TU Chemnitz.

Career development 
Kanoun completed her studies in electrical engineering and information technology at the Technical University of Munich in 1995. She received her doctorate from the University of the Bundeswehr University Munich in 2001. Her thesis "Kalibrationsfreie Temperaturmessung" was awarded the research prize of the Arbeitskreis der Hochschullehrer für Messtechnik (AHMT e. V.). She then founded the Impedance Specroscopy a working group at the Bundeswehr University Munich. Her habilitation took place abroad. From 2006 to 2007 she was substitute professor for measurement technology at the University of Kassel. Since 2007 she is professor for measurement and sensor technology at the Chemnitz University of Technology.

Research 
Kanoun's research deals with sensors, measurement systems and measurement methods. Among other things, it develops new sensors and new measurement solutions based on impedance spectroscopy. Applications include battery diagnosis and material tests. She also develops force, temperature and humidity measurements.

Awards 
Recognition of excellence in the field on the National Day of Women of Tunisia

References 

Living people
Academic staff of the Chemnitz University of Technology
Technical University of Munich alumni
Bundeswehr University Munich alumni
Year of birth missing (living people)
Place of birth missing (living people)
Electrical engineering academics
German women engineers